Joliette railway station is a Heritage Railway Station located at 380 Champlain Street in Joliette, Quebec, Canada. It is operated by Via Rail on two routes running from Montreal, Quebec.

See also
 List of designated heritage railway stations of Canada

External links

Buildings and structures in Joliette
Via Rail stations in Quebec
Railway stations in Lanaudière
Designated Heritage Railway Stations in Quebec
Heritage buildings of Quebec